Prudencio Induráin Larraya (born 9 June 1968) is a Spanish retired road racing cyclist. He competed in four editions of the Tour de France. He is the brother of another retired professional cyclist, Miguel Induráin.

In 2011 he entered politics as a candidate for the Navarrese People's Union in the 2011 parliamentary election.

Major results
1993
 3rd Grand Prix of Aargau Canton
1994
 5th Overall Circuit Cycliste Sarthe
1996
 2nd Overall Volta ao Alentejo
1st Stages 1a, 2a & 5
 3rd GP Villafranca de Ordizia

General classification results timeline

References

External links

1968 births
Living people
Sportspeople from Pamplona
Spanish male cyclists
Navarrese People's Union politicians
Cyclists from Navarre